Rima Kallingal is an Indian actress and film producer who mainly appears in Malayalam films. She made her Malayalam film debut with Ritu (2009). She has been married to the Malayalam film director Aashiq Abu since 2013.

Early Life and Career
Born in Thrissur, Kerala, Rima Kallingal began practising dancing when she was three years old. A dancer by profession, she has been a part of a dance company called Nritarutya and has had performances on national and international stages. She studied in Stanes Anglo Indian Higher Secondary School, Coonoor up to Fifth grade. She completed her schooling from Chinmaya Vidyalaya, Thrissur, graduating in 2001. She holds a bachelor's degree in journalism from Christ University, Bengaluru. She is also skilled in Taekwondo (Korean martial art), Chao (Manipuri martial art) and Kalari.

She was a semi-finalist of the Asianet reality show Vodafone Thakadhimi. She moved to Bengaluru to pursue a modelling career and later participated in the Miss Kerala beauty pageant, in which be she became the first runner-up, losing to Shree Thulasi in a tie-breaker.

She was spotted by director Lal Jose on a magazine cover, who cast her for a goat herder role in a Tamil film Mazhai Varappoguthu. The project didn't materialise, but she was offered the lead female character of Varsha by director Shyamaprasad for Ritu, which eventually marked her acting debut. She was 25 when she acted in the film.

In 2012, she acted in the film 22 Female Kottayam which became a big success, commercially as well as critically. She received praises and won many awards for her portrayal of Tessa. She also won the Kerala State Government award for Best Actress. After 22 Female Kottayam she told that she had made some mistakes in her career and stated "Yes, I have done a few films I never should have, but I am determined not to repeat those mistakes".

In 2013, Kallingal turned television anchor with the Mazhavil Manorama show "Midukki". Following which the Kerala Film Chamber imposed a ban on her which was revoked later.

In 2014, she set up her own Dance institute Mamangam in Kochi, Kerala.

Personal life
Kallingal married director Aashiq Abu on 1 November 2013, in a simple ceremony held in Kakkanad Registration office, Kochi. As part of the occasion, they donated Rs 1 million towards the welfare of poor cancer patients at the General Hospital, Ernakulam, and Rs 25,000 to meet a day's expense of the dietary kitchen at the hospital.

Filmography

As actor
All projects are in Malayalam language unless noted

As producer

References

External links
 
 

Indian film actresses
Actresses in Tamil cinema
Living people
Actresses from Thrissur
Kerala State Film Award winners
Actresses in Malayalam cinema
21st-century Indian actresses
Filmfare Awards South winners
Indian television actresses
Actresses in Malayalam television
Female models from Kerala
Christ University alumni
Indian female taekwondo practitioners
Year of birth missing (living people)